Bénac is a commune in the Ariège department of southwestern France.

Population
Inhabitants of Bénac are called Bénacois.

See also
Communes of the Ariège department

References

Communes of Ariège (department)
Ariège communes articles needing translation from French Wikipedia